Maria Luise may refer to:

Maria Luise Thurmair (1912–2005), a German Catholic theologian and hymnwriter
Maria Luise von Quistorp (10 June 1928 - 29 April 2016), wife of Wernher von Braun
Maria-Luise Rainer (born 1959), an Italian luger

See also
Maria Louisa
Maria Louise
Maria Luisa